The Lessing Prize of the Free State of Saxony is a German literary award. It was founded in 1993 by the Government of the Free State of Saxony and is awarded every two years. It consists of a main prize, which honours outstanding achievements in the spirit of Gotthold Ephraim Lessing, especially in the field of literature, literary criticism and the theater. This prize is worth 20,000 euros. In addition, two further "promotional prizes" are awarded, which seek to publicly recognize and promote promising beginnings in these fields. These prizes are each worth 5,500 euros.

The award ceremony usually takes place on 21 January, the eve of Lessing's birthday (22 January 1729), as part of the celebrations organized by the Lessing Museum in his native town of Kamenz. The award builds on the tradition of the Lessing Prize of the GDR , which was awarded from 1955 to 1989 by the Ministry of Culture of the GDR.

Winners 
 1993: Hans Sahl; also Lutz Graf
 1995: Rolf Hoppe; also Angela Krauss
 1997: Wolfgang Hilbig; also Kerstin Hensel and Ulrich Zieger
 1999: Eduard Goldstücker; also Marion Titze and Marcel Beyer
 2001: Adolf Dresen; also Barbara Köhler and Oliver Bukowski
 2003: Hans Joachim Schädlich; also Anke Stelling together with Robby Dannenberg and Christian Lehnert
 2005: Armin Petras; also Martina Hefter and Jörg Bernig
 2007: Ruth Klüger; also Volker Sielaff and Clemens Meyer
 2009: Kito Lorenc; also Ulrike Almut Sandig and Dirk Laucke
 2011: Monika Maron; also Renatus Deckert and Andreas Heidtmann
 2013: Volker Lösch; also Franziska Gerstenberg and Judith Schalansky
 2015: Carolin Emcke; also Julius Fischer and Wolfram Höll
 2017: Kurt Drawert; also Thomas Freyer and Anna Kaleri
 2019: Marcel Beyer; also Anja Kampmann and Bettina Wilpert
 2021: ; also Jackie Thomae, Anna Mateur and Jasna Zajček

Related awards
 
 
 
  for the Cultural Award of the German Freemasons

References

External links
 

German literary awards